Dominic McKinley (born 1960 in Loughguile, County Antrim) is an Irish former sportsperson. He played hurling with his local club Loughgiel Shamrocks and was a member of the Antrim county team in the 1980s and 1990s.

References

 

1960 births
Living people
Antrim inter-county hurlers
Hurling managers
Loughgiel Shamrocks hurlers
Ulster inter-provincial hurlers